Zachary Joseph Miller (born December 11, 1985) is an American former professional football player who was a tight end in the National Football League (NFL). He was drafted by the Oakland Raiders in the second round of the 2007 NFL Draft. He played college football for the Arizona State Sun Devils, earning consensus All-American honors. Miller also played for the Seattle Seahawks, with whom he earned a Super Bowl ring in Super Bowl XLVIII over the Denver Broncos.

Miller now works as an associate at AWM Capital.

Early Years
Miller was born in Tempe, Arizona and attended Altadena Middle School as well as Desert Vista High School in nearby Phoenix, where he played football and competed in track. Miller played in the 2004 U.S. Army All-American Bowl, which is an annual all-star game for the nation's best high school football players.

Also a standout performer in the throwing events, Miller was a three-year letterman in track & field, and he set the school discus record and was the shot put regional champion in 2004. He had personal-best throws of 49.20 meters in the discus throw and 15.93 meters in the shot put.

College Football Career
Miller enrolled at Arizona State University, where he played for the Arizona State Sun Devils football team from 2004 to 2006. In three seasons at Arizona State, he caught 144 passes for 1,512 yards, and 14 touchdown receptions. He was named a John Mackey Award finalist in 2006. Miller was an All-America selection by the AFCA and the Walter Camp Foundation in 2006.

Professional Football Career

Oakland Raiders
Miller was projected to be a first round pick; however, his slightly disappointing performance at the combine caused him to be drafted early in the second round (38th overall), by the Oakland Raiders. The Raiders selected him after many disappointments at the team's tight end position, including Doug Jolley, Courtney Anderson, and Randal Williams. He finished his rookie year with 44 catches for 444 yards and 3 touchdowns. Miller was added to the AFC 2011 Pro Bowl roster after Antonio Gates withdrew due to injury. Miller led the Raiders in receiving in 2008, 2009, and 2010, totaling 60 receptions for 685 yards and a career-high five touchdowns during the 2010 campaign. His receptions total was the eighth-highest among NFL tight ends. Miller moved into third place on the Raiders career receiving list for tight ends with 226 receptions over four seasons. His career totals during his time with Oakland include 2,712 receiving yards and 12 touchdowns.

Seattle Seahawks
On August 2, 2011, Miller signed with the Seattle Seahawks on a 5-year, $34 million deal, $17 million of which is guaranteed. Head Coach Pete Carroll stated that Miller would become a great part of the offense. He finished off his first season with 25 receptions for 233 yards and no touchdowns catches. Miller was played more as a blocking tight end during the season.

In the 2012-13 NFL Playoffs, Miller was the leading receiver for the Seahawks in both games, and had 142 yards in the 30–28 loss to the Atlanta Falcons.

Miller earned a championship ring when the Seahawks won Super Bowl XLVIII following the 2013 season, in which they defeated the Denver Broncos 43–8.

Miller was placed on the injured/reserve list for the Seattle Seahawks due to his ankle injury. Miller had ankle surgery in the off week of the 2014-15 season but was still rehabilitating from surgery to ensure his ankle would be safe and strong enough to play.

On March 6, 2015, Miller was released by the Seahawks due to a failed physical.

Wealth Management Career 
Upon retiring from the NFL in 2015, Miller returned to ASU so he could finish his undergraduate studies. After earning a Bachelor of Science in Finance degree, he immersed himself in certified financial planning coursework. In March 2020, he passed the certified financial planner exam earning his CFP designation.

He started work at AWM Capital in September 2020 to be part of a team "attempting to revamp the current financial system plaguing an abundance of professional athletes. AWM specializes in the oversight and management of the wealth of players and entertainers, business founders and their families."

On athletes financial struggles, Miller said: “A lot of times, you don’t hear the stories of guys losing money until it makes some type of national news...People don’t want to talk about their finances. Either, they don’t know enough about it, or no one wants to talk about their (losses).”

Personal life
Miller is married to his wife Ashley.  They have 4 children together.

References

External links

 Seattle Seahawks bio 
 Arizona State Sun Devils bio
 Zach Miller's Financial Planning Career

1985 births
Living people
All-American college football players
American football tight ends
Arizona State Sun Devils football players
Oakland Raiders players
Sportspeople from Tempe, Arizona
Players of American football from Phoenix, Arizona
Seattle Seahawks players